"Oye Mi Canto (Hear My Voice)" is a song by Cuban-American singer-songwriter Gloria Estefan, released as a single from her debut solo album, Cuts Both Ways (1989). In the US, it was the fourth single from the album and was released in April 1990. It was the second single in the UK, released on September 4, 1989, and throughout Europe in September and October 1989.

Composition and release
A latin dance track, the song exemplified some of Estefan's musical roots, much like in the style of her earlier music with Miami Sound Machine, and is much in the style of "Conga" and "Rhythm Is Gonna Get You". Though the song was only a minor chart hit in the US, it was more successful internationally. Furthermore, Estefan obtained her first MTV Video Music Award for this song for the "International Viewer's Choice Awards" in 1990. The remixes of the song and short editions were created by Pablo Flores, who would go on to remix many other Gloria Estefan recordings, as well as Keith Cohen and David Morales.

Critical reception
Bill Coleman from Billboard wrote, "Pop diva appears primed for club acceptance once again with this undeniably catchy tune, which comes with not only the requisite house mixes, but also English and Spanish versions. Ernest Hardy from Cashbox commented, "Wherein little Gloria gets back in touch with her roots, then has them retouched so they’re palatable to the club crowd. There’s a Def 12", a House Mix, the 12” Pablo Mix and a Spanish version. Because Estefan has such a large following, this will do well regardless, but it has a forced feel to it, with all these mixes, none of which quite ring true." 

Pan-European magazine Music & Media found that "a bouncy salsa feel and a tough dance beat combine to support Estefan's voice. Latin music has never been a big commercial proposition in Western Europe but songs like this could change all that." Pat Thomas from Number One named it the "most exciting cut" of the album, complimenting it as "stunning". A reviewer from People felt that the song "seems much looser and much closer to the group’s Latin origins". Mike Soutar from Smash Hits wrote that it's "choc-full of demented drum rhythms, carnival whistles and shrill trumpet parpings. It'll have people going "Arriba!" all over the shop and doing the rumba till they keel over, most probably."

Retrospective response
AllMusic editor Jason Birchmeier remarked that the song is "club-ready" with its "big late-'80s synth-drum patterns", complimenting it as a "super" song. In 2012, Pip Ellwood-Hughes from Entertainment Focus featured "Oye Mi Canto" in their list of "Our Top 10 Gloria Estefan Singles", declaring it as a "uptempo party track". In an 2016 retrospective review, Pop Rescue described it as "a fantastic foot-tapping latin music song".

Music video
A music video was produced to promote the single, directed by Paula Walker. It was later published on Estefan's official YouTube channel in 2009, and had generated more than 13 million views as of March 2023.

Track listings

Charts

References

External links
Lyrics with English translation

1989 singles
1990 singles
Gloria Estefan songs
Spanish-language songs
Songs written by Gloria Estefan
1989 songs
Epic Records singles